The British Arctic Expedition of 1875–1876, led by Sir George Strong Nares, was sent by the British Admiralty to attempt to reach the North Pole via Smith Sound.

Although the expedition failed to reach the North Pole, the coasts of Greenland and Ellesmere Island were extensively explored and large amounts of scientific data were collected.

History
Two ships,  and —captained by Henry Frederick Stephenson—sailed from Portsmouth on 29 May 1875.

On this expedition, Nares became the first explorer to take his ships all the way north through the channel between Greenland and Ellesmere Island —now named Nares Strait in his honour— to the Lincoln Sea. Up to this time, it had been a popular theory that this route would lead to the supposed Open Polar Sea, an ice-free region surrounding the pole, but Nares found only a wasteland of ice.

A sledging party under Commander Albert Hastings Markham set a new record, Farthest North of 83° 20′ 26″ N. Meanwhile, senior lieutenant Lewis Beaumont led another dogsled party from Discovery Harbour heading eastward in April 1876 to explore the northwestern shores of Greenland, reaching Sherard Osborn Fjord before turning back on 22 May.

Overall the expedition was a near-disaster. The men suffered badly from scurvy and were hampered by inappropriate clothing and equipment. Realising that his men could not survive another winter in the ice, Nares hastily retreated southward with both his ships in the summer of 1876. However, naval personnel and topographers, among them Thomas Mitchell, did succeed in documenting, by photograph, the Northern indigenous peoples and landscapes of what would become Canada's Northwest Territories and, later, Nunavut.

The expedition included Petty Officer Adam Ayles, after whom both the Ayles Ice Shelf and Mount Ayles are named. Other features named after the expedition include the Markham Ice Shelf, Nares Strait, Repulse Harbour and Alert, the most northerly permanently inhabited place on earth. Pelham Aldrich was a lieutenant on the expedition and commanded the Western Sledge Party to Ellesmere Island, where Cape Aldrich was named in his honour.

Aftermath 
After the expedition returned to Britain, both Nares and the Admiralty faced criticism for the expedition's return after less than one year in the Arctic and for the outbreak of scurvy. Much of the criticism focused on the fact that the expedition's officers had continued to issue a rum ration on sledging journeys. An Admiralty report concluded that this decision had been unwise and had contributed to the scurvy outbreak.

See also 
Cartographic expeditions to Greenland
List of Arctic expeditions

Citations

Bibliography 
 George Nares: Narrative of a voyage to the Polar Sea during 1875–76 in H.M. ships 'Alert' and 'Discovery, two volumes, London 1878; online book Volume 1 & Volume 2
 John Edwards Caswell. The RGS and the British Arctic Expedition, 1875–76. The Geographical Journal 143(2) (Jul., 1977), pp. 200–210.

19th century in Greenland
19th century in the Arctic
19th-century history of the Royal Navy
Arctic expeditions
Expeditions from the United Kingdom